Quiina colonensis is a species of plant in the family Ochnaceae. It is found in Costa Rica and Panama. It is threatened by habitat loss.

References

Ochnaceae
Vulnerable plants
Taxonomy articles created by Polbot
Flora of Costa Rica
Flora of Panama